The national symbols of Mongolia are official and unofficial flags, icons or cultural expressions that are emblematic, representative or otherwise characteristic of Mongolia and of its culture.

Symbol

References 

National symbols of Mongolia